The greater long-tailed hamster (Tscherskia triton) is a rodent native to Siberia, the Korean Peninsula, and China. It is the only member of the genus Tscherskia.

Taxonomy
The genetic diversity of Tscherskia triton has a positive correlation to population density when using microsatellite markers.

Conservation
Climate change and human activity have had an influence on the genetic variation of this species.

Behavior 
Male greater long-tailed hamsters exhibit high aggression during both the breeding and non-breeding seasons. Female greater long-tailed hamsters mainly show aggression during the non-breeding season.

References

Mammals described in 1899
Taxa named by William Edward de Winton
Hamsters
Mammals of Asia